Killen may refer to:

Places
 Killen, Alabama, U.S.
 Killen Station, a coal-fired power plant in Adams County, Ohio
 Killen, County Tyrone, Northern Ireland
 Killen, Highland, Scotland

Other uses
 Killen (surname)